Welcome Mart was an Australian supermarket chain that was founded by David and Holdings in Canberra and New South Wales in 1992, the same time they rebranded some of Canberra's supermarkets as Festival. They rebranded all the Foodmaster Supermarkets. The first stores opened in Downer, Fraser, Dickson, McKellar, Melba, Kingston, Kambah, Macquarie, Queanbeyan, Latham, Holder and Isaacs.

In 1994, one supermarket opened in Theodore.

Eventually, by 2014, almost all Welcome Mart Supermarkets were bought out. The Isaacs Welcome Mart was rebranded as a general supermarket in 2000, and in 2014, it rebranded and now operates as Shoplands.

Slogan

"The Friendliest Supermarket in Town"

Citations

References

Defunct supermarkets of Australia
Australian companies established in 1992
Food and drink companies established in 1992
Retail companies established in 1992
Retail companies disestablished in 2014
2014 disestablishments in Australia
Australian grocers